Porter House, also known as The Farm or Porter Family Homestead, in Raymond, Mississippi, is a vernacular Greek Revival house that was built in c. 1850.  It was listed on the National Register of Historic Places in 1986 at its original location, about three miles southeast of Raymond.  It was moved to a location in Raymond in 2004 and has been renovated.

In 1986 it was deemed "architecturally significant because it is the only example of a one-room deep, ante-bellum, Greek Revival
cottage" in the Raymond area that was surveyed.

References

Houses completed in 1850
Houses on the National Register of Historic Places in Mississippi
Houses in Raymond, Mississippi
National Register of Historic Places in Hinds County, Mississippi